Héctor Alejandro Barra Zúñiga (born 24 April 1978) was a Chilean footballer. He played for O'Higgins.

Career 
He joined O'Higgins F.C. in 1998 and in 2001 he debuted in his professional career. He was in the Rancagüino team until 2007, he lost his title to Carol Texas on Clausura 2007.

References
 Profile at BDFA 
 

1978 births
Living people
Chilean footballers
Curicó Unido footballers
Magallanes footballers
Santiago Morning footballers
Deportes Melipilla footballers
O'Higgins F.C. footballers
Chilean Primera División players
Primera B de Chile players
Association football goalkeepers
People from Rancagua